Walton Common is a 25.5 hectare biological Site of Special Scientific Interest (SSSI) near the village of Walton in Gordano, North Somerset, notified in 1991.

The common, which is both a Scheduled Ancient Monument and an SSSI, is covered by a Countryside Stewardship agreement with the Countryside Agency. It remains in private ownership, but  the Avon Wildlife Trust has a 10-year lease to manage it as a nature reserve. The site has two saucer-shaped round barrows from the  Bronze Age, and the Walton Common banjo enclosure, a banjo enclosure from the late Iron Age that may be a univallate hillfort, with associated fields.

Wildflowers found on the common include thyme, marjoram, rock-rose, St John's wort, autumn gentian and violets. Butterflies are particularly notable including common blue, brown argus, grizzled and dingy skipper, green and purple hairstreak, and dark green fritillary. Other insects such as grasshoppers, glow-worms and moths are abundant. Birds identified at the site include; blackcap, whitethroat, buzzard, kestrel and sparrowhawk.

References

Sites of Special Scientific Interest in North Somerset
Sites of Special Scientific Interest notified in 1991
Nature reserves in Somerset
Scheduled monuments in North Somerset
Bronze Age sites in Somerset